Maciej Śliwowski (born 10 January 1967) is a retired Polish football forward.

References

External links
 

1967 births
Living people
Polish footballers
Poland international footballers
Polish expatriate footballers
Stal Mielec players
VfL Bochum players
Zagłębie Lubin players
Legia Warsaw players
SK Rapid Wien players
FC Admira Wacker Mödling players
SV Ried players
Ekstraklasa players
Bundesliga players
Austrian Football Bundesliga players
Expatriate footballers in Germany
Expatriate footballers in Austria
Footballers from Warsaw
Znicz Pruszków managers
Association football forwards
Polish football managers